

Official platforms 
The following platforms are officially supported by Qt:

Qt as of version 6 requires a C++17 compiler, and has some extra support for C++20.

External ports 
After Nokia opened the Qt source code to the community on Gitorious various ports appeared. Here are some of these unofficial platforms:

 Qt for OpenSolaris – Qt for OpenSolaris.
 Qt for Haiku – Qt4 and Qt5 for Haiku.
 Qt for OS/2 – Qt for OS/2, eComStation and ArcaOS.
 Qt for webOS – experimental development of Qt for webOS on Palm Pre.
 Qt for Amazon Kindle DX – experimental development of Qt for Amazon Kindle DX.
 Qt for AmigaOS – Qt for AmigaOS. "a port in progress" of Qt5 for Amiga OS 4 and AmigaOne computers is available.
 Sailfish OS – mobile operating system based on MeeGo.
 Maemo – development is still supported by the community unlike MeeGo and Tizen, which are based on Maemo.

Deprecated ports 
Some ports of Qt are now deprecated and are no longer actively developed. These are list of some of these platforms that may be available, but are not supported anymore:

 Qt for Tizen – Qt for Tizen.
 Symbian – Qt for the Symbian platform. Qt replaced Nokia's Avkon as the supported UI SDK for developing Symbian applications.
 Windows Mobile – Qt for Windows CE 5.0 and Windows Mobile.
 MeeGo / Harmattan  The port for MeeGo and the official native API for Nokia N9. No longer supported, though parts of it lives on in the Sailfish port.
 BlackBerry 10 The Qt 5 port for BlackBerry 10 is unmaintained, however BlackBerry 10 itself is based on Qt 4 using a proprietary UI toolkit.
 Qt Ubuntu – Plugin for Qt 5 to provide Ubuntu integration, including support for the Mir display server.

References 

Qt (software)